Anastasiya Chernenko (Ukrainian Анастасія Михайлівна Черненко, born 11 October 1990 in Zhytomir) is a professional Ukrainian triathlete, winner of the Ukrainian Triathlon Cup 2010, and reserve member of the National Team. Chernenko is decorated with the prestigious title Master of Sports and started to take part in ITU Elite triathlons in 2009.

ITU Competitions 
The following list is based upon the official ITU rankings and the ITU Athletes's Profile Page.
Unless indicated otherwise, the following events are triathlons (Olympic Distance) and refer to the Elite category.

DNF = did not finish · DNS = did not start

Notes

External links 
 Ukrainian Triathlon Federation Федерация триатлона Украины in Ukrainian

Sportspeople from Zhytomyr
Ukrainian female triathletes
1990 births
Living people